Frankie Stanton House (born September 19, 1994) is an American basketball player who last played for the Alaska Aces of the Philippine Basketball Association (PBA). He also played American football as a tight end. He played college basketball at Ball State University, and signed with the Chicago Bears as an undrafted free agent in 2017.

High school and college career
House played high school football and basketball at Concord High School where he was a 3-time Elkhart Truth All-Area First-team selection for basketball and played for the Indiana Elite AAU program while also playing tight end and defensive end.

House signed with Ball State in 2013 where he played in all 30 games and made 21 starts for the Cardinals.

In 2014–2015, House played in all 30 games and made 29 starts for the Cardinals, where he averaged 10.3 points, 5.5 rebounds and 2.4 assists per game, ranking within the top three on the Cardinals roster in all three categories. House also ranked ninth in the MAC for overall field goal percentage.

In 2015–2016, House was selected to both the All-MAC Second-team and MAC All-Defensive Team.

Following the season, House was worked out by the Chicago Bears and decided to declare for the 2017 NFL Draft.

Professional career

Chicago Bears
Despite not playing football at Ball State, House signed with the Chicago Bears as an undrafted free agent tight end on May 11, 2017. He was waived by the Bears on May 31, 2017.

Basketball career

Landstede Hammers
House signed with the Landstede Hammers in 2017 and left the squad in 2019

Alaska Aces
House signed with the Alaska Aces on October 3, 2019 for the PBA Governor's Cup. On October 13, House grabbed a career-high 23 rebounds to go along with 22 points in a 78–71 win over the Rain or Shine Elasto Painters.

Career statistics

Professional

|-
| align="left" |  2017–18
| align="left" | Landstede Hammers
| Dutch League
| 35 || 24.1 || .515 || .395 || .757 || 6.2 || 1.3 || .9 || .3 || 12.3
|-
|-
| align="left" |  2018–19
| align="left" | Landstede Hammers
| Dutch League
| 15 || 23.3 || .462 || .160 || .750 || 6.8 || 1.7 || .7 || .2 || 10.2
|-
| align="left" |  2019
| align="left" | Alaska Aces
| PBA
| 9 || 37.7 || .435 || .143 || .818 || 13.0 || 3.6 || .2 || .9 || 17.4
|-
|-class=sortbottom
| align="center" colspan=2 | Career
| All Leagues
| 59 || 26.0 || .484 || .286 || .767 || 7.4 || 1.8 || .8 || .4 || 12.5

References

External links
 Ball State Cardinals bio
 SBNation story

1994 births
Living people
Alaska Aces (PBA) players
American expatriate basketball people in the Netherlands
American expatriate basketball people in the Philippines
American football tight ends
American men's basketball players
Ball State Cardinals men's basketball players
Basketball players from Indiana
Chicago Bears players
Landstede Hammers players
People from Elkhart, Indiana
Philippine Basketball Association imports
Players of American football from Indiana
Small forwards